Chattogram Cantonment is situated near Bayezid Bostami of Chattogram, Bangladesh. It is the headquarters of 24th infantry division.

History 
An Indian army tank captured by the East Bengal Regiment (based in Chattogram cantonment) near Lahore in the 1965 Indo-Pak war is displayed in the cantonment. On 30 May 1981, President Ziaur Rahman was assassinated in Chattogram city by officers based in Chattogram Cantonment. The base commander General Abul Manzur was also accused of involvement in the coup. He himself was killed on 2 June 1981.

Installation
 Combined Military Hospital (CMH)
 8th East Bengal Regiment
 Trust Transport Services office
 HQ 24th Infantry Division
 Station Headquarters, Chattogram Cantonment
 Area Headquarters, Chattogram Area
 HQ 34th Engineer Construction Brigade

Educational institutions
 Chattogram Cantonment Public College
 Army Medical College, Chattogram
 Cantonment Board High School
 Cantonment English School and College, Chattogram
Bayzid Bostami Cantonment board High School
Birshrestha Mohiuddin Jahangir Cantonmentnt Board High school

See also
 Cumilla Cantonment
 Alikadam Cantonment
 Savar Cantonment

References

Cantonments of Bangladesh
Chittagong